Alec Bedser (20 May 1948 – 5 June 1981) was a South African cricketer. He played in one List A and three first-class matches for Border in 1971/72. He was killed in a road accident, aged 33.

See also
 List of Border representative cricketers

References

External links
 

1948 births
1981 deaths
South African cricketers
Border cricketers
Cricketers from East London, Eastern Cape